Judge Dredd: Death Trap is a Big Finish Productions audio drama released in April 2002 and based on the character Judge Dredd in British comic 2000 AD. It stars Toby Longworth as Judge Dredd, Claire Buckfield as his ally and former mentee Judge Amy Steel (introduced in the March 2002 audio drama Judge Dredd: Wanted: Dredd or Alive), and Mark Gatiss as the undead Judge Death.

Plot
The year is 2124. It is Necropolis Day, the 12th anniversary of when Mega-City One was finally freed from temporary rule by the Dark Judges, undead monsters from a parallel Earth they call Deadworld. With their power and the aid of their Sisters of Death, the Dark Judges had turned the city into their personal Necropolis, killing over 60 million people before Judge Dredd, Judge Anderson and others were able to defeat them. Now, a radical group known as Death's Release claims the powerful "alien superfiend" Judge Death and his Dark Judges were not responsible for the Necropolis and are unlawfully imprisoned. They claim the official history of Necropolis is a lie that must be removed from history books, saying the true villains behind any deaths were the Judges who rule and patrol the city.

Since his undead body was destroyed, Judge Death still exists only as a gaseous spirit. He is guarded by robo-judges (who cannot be possessed or influenced by him) and contained in isolation in Iso-Block 99, having been separated from the other Dark Judges three years before on Dredd's recommendation. Judge Dredd visits on the Necropolis Day anniversary, as he has done every year since Death's imprisonment after the Necropolis affair. Like the other Dark Judges, Death's spirit was held within a "glasseen crystal" but a flaw was discovered in its structure, so his spirit form is temporarily being held in a more conventional, sealed iso-cube cell while another crystal is prepared. Judge Death remarks that he and Dredd are two very similar people with similar goals, and adds that Death's Release will soon help him escape Iso-Block 99. Dredd learns that historian Nigella Gaiman has been allowed to interview Death, the Justice Department hoping the monster might become comfortable enough to reveal to her how he is able to sometimes hide from Psi-Judge scans and precognitive visions. So far, Gaiman has reported no such information being shared.

Judge Dredd's latest protégée Judge Amy Steel arrives at Sylvia Plath Block where twelve years before Judge Death had hidden by briefly renting a room under the name "Jay De'Ath." The partially deaf and nearly blind elderly landlady Mrs Gunderson thought he was simply an ordinary if soft-spoken tenant. Judge Steel finds the apartment now treated as a shrine by an illegal gathering of the Disciples of Death, a prohibited cult whose members worship Judge Death. Steel encounters Walter the Wobot, Dredd's former house robot who later went rogue and now serves a probation sentence as Gunderson's housekeeper and caretaker. Walter shares that he overheard the Disciples of Death saying members of Death Release plan to perform a terrorist action that same day at a debate hosted by reporter Enigma Smith. Steel and Dredd both head to Enigma Smith's filming at the Philip Larkin Convention Center.

On Enigma Smith's show, historian Dr. Nigella Gaiman disagrees with many of the claims of Death's Release and believes Judge Death's spirit form should be vaporized for his actions. The program is joined by Jake Black, spokesperson for the political wing of Death's Release who says Gaiman will be among Judge Death's next victims. Gaiman reveals she recognizes "Jake Black" as her former student Seymour Goldkind.

An armored vehicle drives into the convention center, releasing Death Release paramilitary agents. Dredd and Steel take them down, then wound Jake Black when he attempts to kill Dr. Gaiman. The second armored vehicle, operated by remote control and filled with high explosives, heads to Iso-Block 99 and crashes into its walls. The explosion destroys half the building and compromises Death's containment, allowing his escape. Dredd realizes that Death's Release is being funded and directed by someone outside the group. Judge Death possesses Judge Steel and uses her to shoot Nigella Gaiman, then leaves to go "home." Dredd finds Gaiman alive and concludes Steel resisted Death's control enough to wound rather than kill. Gaiman says she believes Death intends to return to his home on Deadworld, and Dredd goes to check the tech lab that deals with dimension-hopping technology, only to then realize this is a dead end.

Realizing Death is actually going "home" to Sylvia Plath block, Dredd heads there. Arriving at Mrs. Gunderson's apartment, Judge Death (still possessing Steel's body) sees that more Disciples of Death have gathered. He instructs them to assemble machinery he arranged to be delivered to Gunderson's home, machinery designed to transform a dead body into a perfect, undead Dark Judge through use of the "Dead Fluids." Gaiman arrives with a gun, revealing to Steel that she is actually in league with Judge Death and loves him. Dredd arrives and realizes the truth, that Death didn't intend to kill her earlier and her interviews were actually a cover to study Iso-Block 99's security so she could later breach it. Gaiman hopes to be united with Death but then the Dark Judge forces her to commit suicide so he can take full possession of her body.

Holding Mrs. Gunderson hostage with Gaiman's gun, Death says he will release the woman if Judge Dredd becomes his next host. He intends to kill Dredd then and treated his body with the Dead Fluids so the Dark Judge can regain his true power and full form. He claims this will also allow Dredd to become immortal in his own way and deliver more justice than ever before. Dredd admits that in pursuit of justice he often has to kill, but argues it is evil to want to kill and enjoy killing. Signaling Steel to get ready, Dredd tells Mrs. Gunderson that her knitting is on the floor. As the landlady ducks out of the way to find her knitting, Dredd fires incendiary rounds, causing Gaiman's body to be engulfed in flame. Death's gaseous spirit is forced to leave the body and then, before the superfiend can possess anyone else, Steel uses Mrs. Gunderson's vacuum cleaner to trap him. His spirit form sealed inside the vacuum, Judge Death can now be returned to containment.

For his help, Dredd decides to cut Walter the Wobot's probation sentence as Mrs. Gunderson's house robot in half. Dredd asks if Mrs. Gunderson wouldn't prefer another apartment, as her own has now been the focus of repeated trouble. Mrs. Gunderson says no, since she actually enjoys how often her home has visitors.

Cast
Toby Longworth - Judge Dredd
Claire Buckfield - Amy Steel
Mark Gatiss - Judge Death
Regina Reagan - Enigma Smith
Jeremy James - Control
Julia Righton - Nigella Gaiman
Liza Ross - Mrs. Gunderson

External links
Big Finish Productions

2002 audio plays
Judge Dredd